Gabardıç (Turkish: Rough Juniper) is a type of Kaşık Havası or Zeybek dance.

Original form

The original form of the Zeybek dance or Kaşık Havası was popular in Burdur.

References

Turkish songs
Songwriter unknown
Year of song unknown
Turkish folk dances
Turkish dances